Deborah J. Mayhew is an American educator and consultant in the field of software usability, usability engineering, and human–computer interaction.  She participated in the founding of SIGCHI and was a volunteer organizer at the first CHI conference in 1983.

Work

Mayhew has published multiple books on usability, including The Usability Engineering Lifecycle.
In 1994, Mayhew co-edited Cost-justifying Usability with Randolph Bias, which was included on professor Gerald J. Alred's list of "essential works" on documentation and usability and described as "famous" by SIGCHI.

In 2023, Mayhew received SIGCHI's Lifetime Practice Award.

References

Human–computer interaction researchers
21st-century American women
Year of birth missing (living people)
Living people